Alfred Bourne (16 April 1848 – 17 July 1931) was an English cricketer. He played four first-class matches for Cambridge University Cricket Club in 1870.

See also
 List of Cambridge University Cricket Club players

References

External links
 

1848 births
1931 deaths
English cricketers
Cambridge University cricketers
People from Atherstone